This is an episode list of the popular science television program Time Warp, which aired on the Discovery Channel.

Series overview

Episodes

Season 1 (2008)

Season 2 (2009)

Season 3 (2009)

References

External links 
 Time Warp episode guide

Lists of non-fiction television series episodes